Boobs in Arms is a 1940 short subject directed by Jules White starring American slapstick comedy team The Three Stooges (Moe Howard, Larry Fine and Curly Howard). It is the 52nd entry in the series released by Columbia Pictures starring the comedians, who released 190 shorts for the studio between 1934 and 1959.

Plot
The Stooges are street peddler greeting card salesmen who anger a man on the street after an accidental altercation. As they go door-to-door, they encounter a woman (Evelyn Young) who requests that they help her make her man-hating husband (Richard Fiske) jealous. Realizing it is the same man they faced before, the Stooges defend themselves against the irate husband with their usual combatives and flee from the husband shouting his threats. In hiding from him, they line up on a queue that takes them to a recruitment office by mistake and they end up joining the army.

No sooner are they getting acclimated with their new army surrounding when they meet their drill instructor: Sergeant Hugh Dare, the irate husband/man on the street they encountered before. Sgt. Dare aggressively attempts to teach the Stooges the standard military drill from the manual of arms. After a series of mishaps, he then threatens them during bayonet practice.

The Stooges are ultimately sent to the front line, where they decide to take a long nap. After learning that Sgt. Dare has been captured by the enemy, they are instructed to detonate a laughing gas shell. After putting the laughing gas bomb in, Curly and Moe use a swab to push the shell further in the cannon, but ends up getting the end of the swab stuck from the inside. As they successfully get it out, Moe falls in a puddle of mud, which Curly admonishes him about going swimming; this angers Moe and he kicks Curly into the cannon where his head becomes lodged. As Larry and Moe get Curly's head out of the cannon, it points at Curly. They push the cannon away from Curly, forcing it to point straight upward. Naturally the shell goes up and then down which manages to explode on them.

Laughing hysterically, the Stooges are captured and brought to enemy headquarters where Sgt. Dare is being detained. The enemy communicates in pig Latin. Hopped up by the gas, the Stooges gleefully use their violence in a wild free for all fight against their captors, including an accidental sword thrust to the rear of the sergeant and his retaliatory punch to the enemy captain that makes him fall on the pointed end of his pickelhaube helmet. The Stooges knock out everyone, including all the enemy soldiers and Sgt. Dare. After emerging victorious, several guns fire at them, with shells whizzing past, the Stooges always ducking in laughter or leaning back giggling, each time missing another shell. Finally, the last shell passes between their legs and takes them into the clouds as they still laugh.

Production notes
Filmed on August 15–20, 1940, the title is a parody of the 1939 MGM film Babes in Arms based on the Lorenz Hart and Richard Rodgers musical. The working title was All This and Bullets Too, a parody in itself of the title of the Warner Bros. film All This and Heaven Too.

Jules White would reuse the army drill footage for the ending of Dizzy Pilots in 1943. Joe Besser had his own version of the army drill routine, which was used on stage for the first time in April 1941 and titled "You're in the Army Now". The skit was revised with Joe Besser and his straight man Jimmy Little who first joined Joe in October 1940 in the Olsen and Johnson production of Sons of Fun (October 1941 until January 1944). White later filmed Besser's performing his army drill version of the routine in 1952 Columbia short, Aim, Fire, Scoot, and its 1956 remake, Army Daze.

Laurel and Hardy played greeting card salesmen who try to make a married woman's husband jealous in 1935's The Fixer Uppers.

After joining the army, Curly beings to recite lyrics from the song "You're in the Army Now". After Curly says "You'll never get rich," Moe stops him before he can utter the next line, sometimes sung as "You son of a bitch".

The closing gag of a person riding a bombshell through the air would be re-created by Slim Pickens in 1964's Dr. Strangelove or: How I Learned to Stop Worrying and Love the Bomb.

Curly's print ad for "O'Brien's Kosher Restaurant" has "dessert" intentionally misspelled as "desert".

Hollywood and the Selective Training and Service Act of 1940
The Selective Training and Service Act of 1940 was passed by the United States Congress on September 16, 1940, becoming the first peacetime conscription in United States history. Hollywood reflected the interest of the American public in Conscription in the United States by having nearly every film studio bring out a military film comedy in 1941 with their resident comedian(s):
Universal Pictures' Abbott and Costello released the first feature film on the subject with Buck Privates, followed by In the Navy and the United States Army Air Corps to Keep 'Em Flying.
Paramount Pictures featured Bob Hope in Caught in the Draft.
Warner Bros. featured Phil Silvers and Jimmy Durante in You're in the Army Now.
Columbia Pictures featured Fred Astaire in the army declaring You'll Never Get Rich.
Hal Roach gave his new comedy team of William Tracy and Joe Sawyer Tanks a Million.
20th Century Fox had former Hal Roach team of Laurel and Hardy in Great Guns.
Walt Disney Productions featured Donald Duck in Donald Gets Drafted
Republic Pictures provided Bob Crosby and Eddie Foy Jr. as Rookies on Parade
Monogram Pictures enlisted Nat Pendleton as Top Sergeant Mulligan.

However, the first comedians to appear in an army comedy were the Stooges with Boobs in Arms. Columbia Pictures placed the Stooges in an unnamed army with military uniforms consisting of Zorro hats and tan uniforms with sergeant chevrons worn upside down to the American way; they are also armed with Civil War-type muskets instead of modern rifles.

References

External links 
 
 
Boobs in Arms at threestooges.net

1940 films
Columbia Pictures short films
1940s war comedy films
American black-and-white films
Films directed by Jules White
Military humor in film
The Three Stooges films
American war comedy films
1940 comedy films
1940s English-language films
1940s American films